Elwyn "Ed" Comstock (July 12, 1903 – December 8, 1980) was an American professional football player who played in the National Football League (NFL) for two seasons with the Buffalo Bisons, Brooklyhn Dodgers, and Staten Island Stapletons. Comstock would appear in a total of 23 career games, while making 10 starts.

References

1903 births
1980 deaths
Buffalo Bisons (NFL) players
Brooklyn Dodgers (NFL) players
Staten Island Stapletons players
People from Montgomery Township, New Jersey